Acrobasis ottomana is a species of snout moth in the genus Acrobasis. It was described by Aristide Caradja in 1916. It is found in Israel.

Taxonomy
It is also listed as a subspecies of Acrobasis obtusella.

References

Moths described in 1916
Acrobasis
Moths of Asia
Taxa named by Aristide Caradja